This is a list of persons who have served as justices of the Arizona Supreme Court.

Arizona Supreme Court justices

Chief justices and vice chief justices
Each January, the justices select a chief and vice chief justice.

Succession of seats

Arizona Territorial Supreme Court justices
Two additional appointees were confirmed by the U.S. Senate to the territorial supreme court, but declined their appointments: John Noble Goodwin in 1863 and Marshall H. Williams in 1894.

Succession of seats

Sources
Arizona Supreme Court Justices
Arizona Constitution, Article VI
Arizona Judicial Branch

References

Arizona
Justices